Paul Foreman (25 January 1939 – 15 December 2020) was a Jamaican long jumper who competed in the 1960 Summer Olympics. He was the gold medallist in that event at the 1958 British Empire and Commonwealth Games. Born in Kingston, Jamaica, He was twice a winner at the British West Indies Championships (1957 and 1960) and also won a triple jump at the former event.

References

1939 births
2020 deaths
Sportspeople from Kingston, Jamaica
Olympic athletes of the British West Indies
Athletes (track and field) at the 1960 Summer Olympics
Jamaican male long jumpers
Commonwealth Games medallists in athletics
Commonwealth Games gold medallists for Jamaica
Athletes (track and field) at the 1958 British Empire and Commonwealth Games
Medallists at the 1958 British Empire and Commonwealth Games